Rogers Building or Rogers Chocolates is a historic building in Victoria, British Columbia, Canada, it is located at 913 Government Street in downtown Victoria.

The two-storey building was completed in 1903 by architects Hooper and Watkins for Charles Rogers (1854–1927), a grocer who operated from the opposite side of the street before 1903. Rogers Chocolates continues to operate from this site since.

The site was designated as a historic building in 1991. It is a small Victorian era commercial building with a Queen Anne Revival shopfront, and intact interior fixtures and decorative features.

See also 
List of historic places in Victoria, British Columbia

References 

Buildings and structures in Victoria, British Columbia
Buildings and structures on the National Historic Sites of Canada register
National Historic Sites in British Columbia
Buildings and structures completed in 1903
Queen Anne architecture in Canada
1903 establishments in British Columbia